Le Cheylard is a commune in the Ardèche department in southern France.

Population

See also
Communes of the Ardèche department

References

External links
Official Web site

Communes of Ardèche
Ardèche communes articles needing translation from French Wikipedia